Shardlow is a surname. Notable people with the surname include:

 Bertie Shardlow, English cricketer
 Neil Shardlow (born 1970), English cricketer
 Paul Shardlow (1943–1968), English footballer
 Wilfred Shardlow (1902–1956), English cricketer